Andrew Norman Meldrum (1876, Alloa – 1934, Edinburgh) was a Scottish scientist known for his work in organic chemistry and for his studies of the history of chemistry.  It has been claimed that Meldrum's acid "is the only chemical to be named after a Scotsman."

He was educated at Robert Gordon's College in Aberdeen, the Royal College of Science in London, and the University of Aberdeen. He taught at the universities of Aberdeen, Liverpool, Sheffield and Manchester, and entered the Indian Education Service in 1912.

His appointments in India included the Chair of Chemistry at the Madhavlal Ranchodal Science Institute in Ahmedabad, and finally, from 1925 until his retirement in 1931, principal of the Royal Institute of Science (University of Bombay).

Selected writings

References

Further reading

External links
Obituary notice, Journal of the Chemistry Society, 1934, 1468–1482, 

1876 births
1934 deaths
People from Alloa
People educated at Robert Gordon's College
Alumni of Imperial College London
Alumni of the University of Aberdeen
Academics of the University of Aberdeen
Academics of the University of Liverpool
Academics of the University of Sheffield
Academics of the University of Manchester
Academic staff of the University of Mumbai
Organic chemists
Scottish chemists
20th-century Scottish historians